Timmermans is a Dutch occupational surname meaning "carpenter's". It is a common name with (in 2007) 11,658 and 6,663 carriers in the Netherlands and Belgium, respectively. People with this surname include:

 Ans Timmermans (1919–1958), Dutch freestyle swimmer
 Christiaan Timmermans (b. 1941), Dutch law professor and judge
 Eimbert Timmermans (b. 1961), Dutch sidecarcross rider
 Felix Timmermans (1886–1947), Belgian author
 Frans Timmermans (b. 1961), Dutch politician, First Vice-President of the European Commission since 2014
 Jesse Timmermans (b. 1989), Dutch tennis player
 Nathalie Timmermans (b. 1989), Dutch softball player
 Nicolas Timmermans (b. 1982), Belgian football defender
 Pieter Timmermans (b. 1964), Belgian businessman, regent of the National Bank of Belgium
 Steven R. Timmermans (b. 1957), American CEO of the Christian Reformed Church in North America
 Theo Timmermans (b.1926–inconclusive), Dutch football forward
 Theo Timmermans (b. 1989) Dutch football goalkeeper

See also 
 Timmermans Brewery, Belgian lambic brewery
 Timmerman

References 

Dutch-language surnames
Occupational surnames